In probability theory, Foster's theorem, named after Gordon Foster, is used to draw conclusions about the positive recurrence of Markov chains with countable state spaces. It uses the fact that positive recurrent Markov chains exhibit a notion of "Lyapunov stability" in terms of returning to any state while starting from it within a finite time interval.

Theorem 

Consider an irreducible discrete-time Markov chain on a countable state space S having a transition probability matrix P with elements pij for pairs i, j in S. Foster's theorem states that the Markov chain is positive recurrent if and only if there exists a Lyapunov function , such that  and

  for 
  for all 

for some finite set F and strictly positive ε.

Related links
 Lyapunov optimization

References

Theorems regarding stochastic processes
Markov processes